Elena Sergeevna Komendrovskaja (born 19 May 1991) is a Russian badminton player.

Achievements

European Junior Championships 
Girls' doubles

BWF International Challenge/Series 
Women's singles

Women's doubles

  BWF International Challenge tournament
  BWF International Series tournament
  BWF Future Series tournament

References

External links 
 

1991 births
Living people
Sportspeople from Perm, Russia
Russian female badminton players
21st-century Russian women